Carterocephalus is a Holarctic genus of skipperlings in the skipper family, Hesperiidae.

The wing colour is yellow, white, dark-brown and black with a variously spotted appearance. The hindwing upperside is dark with clear cut rounded lighter spots. The majority of species are endemic to China.

Species
Listed alphabetically:
Carterocephalus abax Oberthür, 1886 - Tibet
Carterocephalus alcinoides Lee, 1962 - Yunnan
Carterocephalus alcina Evans, 1939 - Yunnan
Carterocephalus argyrostigma (Eversmann, 1851) - Siberia, Mongolia and China
Carterocephalus avanti (de Nicéville, 1886) – orange and silver mountain hopper – Tibet
Carterocephalus canopunctatus (Nabokov 1941)
Carterocephalus christophi Grum-Grshimailo, 1891 - Tibet, western China
Carterocephalus dieckmanni Graesser, 1888 - China
Carterocephalus flavomaculatus Oberthür, 1886 - Tibet, West China
Carterocephalus gemmatus Leech, 1891
Carterocephalus habaensis Yoshino, 1997 - Yunnan
Carterocephalus houangty Oberthür, 1886 - Tibet, western China
Carterocephalus mandan Oberthür, 1891
Carterocephalus micio Oberthür, 1891 - China
Carterocephalus niveomaculatus Oberthür, 1886 - Tibet, West and South China
Carterocephalus palaemon (Pallas, 1771) – chequered skipper
Carterocephalus pulchra (Leech, 1891) - Tibet, western China
Carterocephalus silvicola (Meigen, 1829) – northern chequered skipper
Carterocephalus skada (W. H. Edwards, 1870) Arctic skipper, arctic skipperling

Former species
Carterocephalus plancus Hopffer, 1874 - transferred to Ladda plancus (Hopffer, 1874)

Gallery

References

External links
Hesperiidae of Asian Russia, from Korshunov & Gorbunov (1995)
Lepidoptera page from the Department of Entomology at the Swedish Museum of Natural History
Natural World Heritage Protected Areas Programme
Images representing Carterocephalus at Consortium for the Barcode of Life

Heteropterinae
Hesperiidae genera